The Clan Line was a passenger and cargo shipping company that operated in one incarnation or another from the late nineteenth century and into the twentieth century.

History

Foundation and early years
The company that would become the Clan Line was first founded as C. W. Cayzer & Company in Liverpool in 1877 by Charles Cayzer (see Cayzer baronets). It was set up to operate passenger routes between Britain and Bombay, India via the Suez Canal. The next year, Captain William Irvine joined the company and it was renamed Cayzer, Irvine & Company.

In 1881 the company was joined by an influential Glasgow businessman and his firm of Thomas Dunlop & Sons, and the Clan Line Association of Steamers was established. The company opened a new head office at 109 Hope Street, Glasgow. Cayzer, Irvine built and managed ships for the association and Cayzer himself retained ownership of the original six Clan ships. At the same time, they expanded their operations to South Africa. In 1890 the company became The Clan Line of Steamers Limited with Cayzer holding the majority interest. The company again expanded its operations with the purchase of the Persian Gulf Steam Ship Company in 1894, bringing four more ships into the company. They used these new assets to expand their routes into the Persian Gulf and to North America, and to begin to carry cargo.

The company was incorporated in 1907 as Cayzer, Irvine & Company, Limited, with the Cayzer family retaining control. Charles Cayzer died in 1916, with his sons continuing to run the company. In 1918 they acquired and incorporated the assets of the Scottish Shire Line. Despite suffering losses in the First World War, the company had recovered by the 1930s to become the largest cargo carrying concern in the world.

The Clan Line at war and after
Clan Line saw a large number of its ships either requisitioned by the British government, or otherwise used to ship vital supplies to Britain during the First and Second World Wars. Their ubiquitousness led to them being called the 'Scots Navy' (due to their officers' sleeve rings being identical to those of the Royal Navy) and they were often in dangerous environments, at risk from mines, air attacks or German U-boats.

The Clan Line lost a total of 30 ships in the 1939-45 war.

After the end of the war, the Clan Line commissioned six vessels of the Clan MacLaren class (commonly known as the MacL's) to replace war losses and resume a level of pre-war services. Construction started in 1946 and all six had entered service by 1949. Meanwhile, the immediate shortage was alleviated by the acquisition of a number of wartime standard construction ships, such as the American Liberty ships. Most of these would continue to serve with the Clan Line fleet until 1962, by which time the first vessels of the Clan MacIver class were entering service. Meanwhile, management attempted to further alleviate the shortfall with the purchase of the Thompson Steam Shipping Co. in 1952 and the conversion to motor ships throughout the 1950s.

Post war restructuring
In 1956, under the impetus of Nicholas Cayzer the Clan Line joined with the Union-Castle Line, King Line and Bullard King & Company to form British & Commonwealth Shipping Limited. A number of transfers then took place between the component companies. They formed the Springbok Shipping Company in 1959 to take over the operations of their South African services, and several of the Clan Lines' ships were transferred to it. In 1961 the Springbok Shipping Company became part of Safmarine.

Decline
In the 1970s, British and Commonwealth began to diversify into financial services as passenger shipping declined and cargo shipping evolved into container shipping. By the mid-1980s, the business had evolved into one of the country’s largest financial services companies. The Clan Line, now a subsidiary of British & Commonwealth, ceased trading in 1981 with the final voyage made by MV Clan Macgregor. By 1986 British & Commonwealth had disposed of their last ship.

With the move from the third to the fourth generation of the Cayzer family, the family shareholders were becoming increasingly uncomfortable with the reduction in control over British and Commonwealth, caused by its expansion using shares as currency. In 1987 they decided to sell their stake in British and Commonwealth and to concentrate their collective investment in Caledonia Investments, whose function until that time had primarily been as a holding company. This was a timely decision: the sale took place just prior to the Black Monday stock market crash and, two years later, British and Commonwealth went into receivership.

Shipping
The ships of the Clan Line were usually distinguishable by their names, the vast majority of which had the prefix 'Clan'. Their funnel markings were black with two red bands divided by narrow black band, and they flew the house flag, which was a rectangular red flag bearing a white diamond with a red rampant lion in the centre.

Ships of the Clan Line

Legacy

It was one of the shipping companies commemorated by the Merchant Navy class of Southern Railway locomotives. Locomotive number 35028 built in 1948 carries the name "Clan Line" and is currently maintained in fully operational condition for hauling excursion trains on the UK's national railway system.

See also
 Loch Line
 Caledonia Investments

References

Sources

External links

 
 Caledonia Investments – company homepage
  – JP Morgan & London Business School case study
 

Defunct shipping companies of the United Kingdom
Merchant ships of the United Kingdom
Passenger ships of the United Kingdom
1877 establishments in England
Companies based in Liverpool
Companies based in Glasgow
1956 disestablishments in Scotland
Transport companies established in 1877
Transport companies disestablished in 1956